Isle of Man Target Shooting Federation (IOMTSF) is the umbrella organization for shooting sports on the Isle of Man.

External links 
 Official homepage of Isle of Man Target Shooting Federation

References 

Regions of the International Practical Shooting Confederation
Sports organisations of the Isle of Man